John I of Zweibrücken (known as the Lame; ; 8 May 1550 – 12 August 1604) was Count Palatine and Duke of Zweibrücken during 1569–1604.

He was born in Meisenheim as the second son of Wolfgang, Count Palatine of Zweibrücken and his wife Anna of Hesse. In 1588 he changed the state religion from Lutheranism to Calvinism. He died in Germersheim in 1604 and was buried in the Alexanderkirche in Zweibrücken.

Family and children
He married in 1579 Duchess Magdalene of Jülich-Cleves-Berg, daughter of William "the Rich", Duke of Jülich-Cleves-Berg, and they had the following children:
 Ludwig Wilhelm (28 November 1580 – 26 March 1581)
 Maria Elisabeth (7 November 1581 – 18 August 1637), married in 1601 to George Gustavus, Count Palatine of Veldenz
 Anna Magdalena, born and died in 1583
 John II of Zweibrücken-Veldenz (26 March 1584 – 9 August 1635)
 Frederick Casimir of Zweibrücken-Landsberg (10 June 1585 – 30 September 1645)
 John Casimir of Kleeburg  (20 April 1589 – 18 June 1652), father of Charles X Gustav of Sweden.
 Amalia Jakobäa Henriette (26 September 1592 – 18 May 1655), married 1638 to Count Jakob Franz of Pestacalda
 Elisabeth Dorothea, died young in 1593
 Anna Katharina, born and died in 1597

He died in Germersheim.

Ancestry

External links
 Die Genealogie der Wittelsbacher

1550 births
1604 deaths
People from Bad Kreuznach (district)
House of Palatinate-Zweibrücken
House of Wittelsbach
Counts Palatine of Zweibrücken
Burials at the Alexanderkirche, Zweibrücken